The philosopher and cultural theorist Slavoj Žižek is a prolific writer who has published in numerous languages.

Books

English

As co-author, editor, etc.

Slovenian

Spanish
 2007 En defensa de la intolerancia, Madrid: Sequitur.

Croatian
 2008 Pervertitov vodič kroz film, Zagreb: Hrvatsko društvo pisaca & Izdanja Antibarbarus (Biblioteka Tvrđa), edited by Srećko Horvat. ("The Pervert's Guide to Cinema", collected essays on cinema)
 2015 Islam, Ateizam i Modernost: Neka Bogohulna Razmisljanja, Academic Book ("Islam, Atheism and Modernity: Some Blasphemous Thinking")

Articles

English

French

German

Basque

Ukrainian 

"ПОЧАТИ СПОЧАТКУ Славой ЖИЖЕК". New Left Review, nr. 57, pp. 43–55. May 8, 2009.

Greek 

"ENANTION TΩN ANΘΡΩΠΙΝΩΝ ΔΙΚΑΙΩΜΑΤΩΝ". New Left Review, nr. 34, pp. 115–131. July xx, 2005.

Portuguese 

"A visāo em paralaxe". New Left Review, nr. 25, pp. 121–134. January xx, 2004.
"Como começar do começo". New Left Review, nr. 57, pp. 43–55. May 8, 2009.

Catalan 

« Una revenja de les finances mundials... ‘La guerra de les galàxies’, episodi 3 », dans le Monde diplomatique - édition catalane, 18 mai 2005.
"Una emergència econòmica permanent". New Left Review, nr. 64, pp. 85–95. August 19, 2010.

Spanish 

Non-exhaustive list of Žižek in castellano.

Italian 
"Capitalisti sì, ma solo zen...". Le Monde diplomatique (Italian edition). May xx, 2005. Archived from the original on 2016-03-06.
«Il filosofo: «Sto con Kim Kardashian, incarna l’essenza della celebrità», from Corriere della Sera, October 2016.

Norwegian 

Bibliography
Bibliography
Bibliographies by writer
Bibliographies of Slovene writers